Saarland was a German fishing trawler that was built as A. R. Giese. Renamed in 1935, she was requisitioned by the Kriegsmarine in the Second World War for use as a Vorpostenboot. She served as V 407 Saarland and V 411 Saarland. She was sunk in the Gironde in 1944 by a boiler explosion.

Description
The engine was made by Deschimag Seebeckwerft, Wesermünde, Germany. It was rated at 91nhp. The engine powered a single screw propeller driven via a low pressure turbine, double reduction gearing and a hydraulic coupling.

History
The ship was built as yard number 520 by Deschimag Seekbeckwerft, Wesermünde for the Reederei Siebert & Co., Wesermünde. She was launched on 27 June 1934 and completed on 4 August. The fishing boat registration PG 416 was allocated. She was allocated the Code Letters DEWJ. On 22 January 1935, she was renamed Saarland.

Saarland was requisitioned by the Kriegsmarine on 25 September 1939 for use as a vorpostenboot. She was allocated to 4 Vorpostenflotille as V 407 Saarland. On 16 October she was redesignated V 411 Saarland. On 26 August 1944, she was attacked at Le Verdon-sur-Mer, Gironde, France by Bristol Beaufighter aircraft of 236 Squadron, Royal Air Force and 404 Squadron, Royal Canadian Air Force. She suffered a boiler explosion and sank in the Gironde.

References

Sources

1934 ships
Ships built in Bremen (state)
Fishing vessels of Germany
Steamships of Germany
World War II merchant ships of Germany
Auxiliary ships of the Kriegsmarine
Maritime incidents in August 1944
Maritime boiler explosions
Ships sunk by British aircraft
Ships sunk by Canadian aircraft
World War II shipwrecks in the Atlantic Ocean
Shipwrecks in the Bay of Biscay